Talat (also transliterated as Talaat and Tal'at; ;) is a Turkish given name used in Turkey, Egypt, Pakistan, India, Iran and the Levant. Notable people with the name include:

Talaat Pasha (1874–1921), leader of the Ottoman Empire during the First World War
Talaat Afifi, Egyptian academic
Talat Ahmad, Indian geologist
Talat Ahmed (born 1948), Pakistani cricketer
Talat Ali (born 1950), Pakistani cricketer
Talat Aziz (born 1956), ghazal singer from Hyderabad, India
Talaat Harb, Egyptian industrialist and banker
Talât Sait Halman (1931–2014), Turkish poet, translator and cultural historian
Talat Hussain (actor) (born 1945), Pakistani actor
Talat Hussain (journalist) (born 1966), executive director of AAJ Television
Talat Hussain (news executive) (born 1966), executive director of AAJ Television
Talat Mahmood (1924–1998), Indian playback singer and film actor
Talat Masood (born 1932), general in the Pakistan Army Corps of Engineers
Talat Othman (born 1936), Palestinian-American businessman, investor, and Republican fundraiser
Tal'at Fu'ad Qasim (died 1995), leader of Egypt's militant Gama'a Islamiyya organization
Talat Tuncel (born 1964), Turkish football manager and former footballer
Talat Tunçalp (1915–2017), Turkish Olympian road cyclist
Telat Üzüm (born 1963), Turkish football manager

Turkish masculine given names
Arabic masculine given names